Schindler is a German surname that is derived from the German word "schindel", which means "shingle". This suggests that the original bearers of the name were in the roofing business. Variations and alternate spellings of the name include: Shindler, Schindel, and Schindelle. 

 Adam Schindler (born 1983), American mixed martial artist 
 Alexander M. Schindler (1925–2000), American Reform rabbi
 Allen R. Schindler, Jr. (1969–1992), American navy petty officer, victim of a hate crime
 Alma Schindler (1879–1964), later known as Alma Mahler-Werfel, Austrian composer
 Ambrose Schindler (born c. 1920), American football (American football) player
 Anton Felix Schindler (1795–1864), secretary and early biographer of Ludwig van Beethoven
 Anton Karl Schindler (1879–1964), German botanist
 Christopher Schindler (born 1990), German footballer
 Bill Schindler (1909–1952), American race car driver
 David Schindler (born 1940), American-Canadian ecologist
 Denise Schindler (born 1985), German Paralympic cyclist
 Emil Jakob Schindler (1842–1892), Austrian landscape painter,  father of Alma Mahler
 Emilie Schindler (1907–2001), German  humanitarian, wife of Oskar Schindler
 Frederic Schindler (born 1980), French-Argentinean music supervisor and entrepreneur
 George Schindler (born 1929), American stage magician, magic consultant, comedian, actor, ventriloquist and writer
 Hans Schindler Bellamy (1901–1982), Austrian researcher and author
 Harold Schindler (1929–1998), American journalist and historian
 Kevin Schindler (born 1988), German footballer
 Kingsley Schindler (born 1993), German footballer
 Kurt Schindler (1882–1935), German composer and conductor
 Jan Schindler (born 1978), Czech rower
 Jochem Schindler (1944–1994), Austrian Indo-Europeanist
 Lisa Schindler (born 1929), Austrian sprint canoer
 Lynn Schindler (1944–2018), American politician and businesswoman
 Martin Schindler (born 1996), German darts player
 Marvin Schindler (1932–2003), American professor of German and Slavic studies
 Matthias Schindler (born 1982), German para-cyclist
 Osmar Schindler (1869–1927), German painter 
 Oskar Schindler (1908–1974), German businessman who saved his Jewish workers from the Holocaust, subject of the film Schindler's List
 Otto Schindler (canoeist) (born 1925), Austrian sprint canoer
 Otto Schindler (zoologist) (1906–1956), German zoologist
 Paul Schindler (born 1952), American computer journalist
 Peter Schindler (born 1960), German composer, musician and author
 Poul Christian Schindler (1648–1740), Danish composer
 Rudolf Schindler (doctor) (1888–1968), German physician and gastroenterologist
 Rudolph Schindler (architect) (1887–1953), Austrian-born American architect
 Solomon Schindler (1842–1915), American rabbi
 Steve Schindler (born 1954), American football (American football) player
 Szabolcs Schindler (born 1974), Hungarian football (soccer) player
 Valentin Schindler (died 1604), German Lutheran Hebraist and professor
 Walter Schindler (1897–1991), American navy officer

German-language surnames
Occupational surnames